The alpine skiing mixed team event competition of the Beijing 2022 Olympics was held on 20 February, on "Rainbow" course at the Xiaohaituo Alpine Skiing Field in Yanqing District. Austria won the event, with Germany second and Norway third.

Switzerland were the defending champion, with Austria and Norway the defending silver and bronze medalists, respectively. Norway were the 2021 world champion, ahead of Sweden and Germany.

The event scheduled for Saturday, February 19, but was moved to Sunday, February 20 due to strong winds.

Qualification

Teams and participating athletes:

Katharina Huber
Katharina Liensberger
Katharina Truppe
Stefan Brennsteiner
Michael Matt
Johannes Strolz

Cassidy Gray
Erin Mielzynski
Trevor Philp
Erik Read

Kong Fanying
Ni Yueming
Xu Mingfu
Zhang Yangming

Tereza Nová
Elese Sommerová
Kryštof Krýzl
Jan Zabystřan

Clara Direz
Coralie Frasse Sombet
Tessa Worley
Mathieu Faivre
Thibaut Favrot
Alexis Pinturault

Emma Aicher
Lena Dürr
Julian Rauchfuß
Alexander Schmid
Linus Straßer

Marta Bassino 
Federica Brignone
Nicol Delago
Luca De Aliprandini
Tommaso Sala
Alex Vinatzer

Mina Fürst Holtmann
Thea Louise Stjernesund
Maria Therese Tviberg
Timon Haugan
Fabian Wilkens Solheim
Rasmus Windingstad

Zuzanna Czapska
Maryna Gąsienica-Daniel
Magdalena Łuczak
Michał Jasiczek
Paweł Pyjas

Anastasia Gornostaeva
Julia Pleshkova
Ekaterina Tkachenko
Aleksandr Andrienko
Ivan Kuznetsov

Petra Hromcová
Rebeka Jančová
Adam Žampa
Andreas Žampa

Ana Bucik
Tina Robnik
Andreja Slokar
Miha Hrobat
Žan Kranjec

Hanna Aronsson Elfman
Hilma Lövblom
Kristoffer Jakobsen
Mattias Rönngren

Andrea Ellenberger
Wendy Holdener
Camille Rast
Gino Caviezel
Justin Murisier

AJ Hurt
Paula Moltzan
Mikaela Shiffrin
Tommy Ford
River Radamus
Luke Winters

FIS Overall Nations Cup standings
The participating nations were seeded according to the Overall Nations Cup standings prior to the 2022 Winter Olympics.

As Croatia declined a spot in the team event, their allocation passed to the next eligible NOC, which was ROC.

Results
The race was started at 09:00.

Bracket

 Notes
 Teams marked with asterisks won by faster accumulated time of the best male and the best female skier.

References

Alpine skiing at the 2022 Winter Olympics
Mixed events at the 2022 Winter Olympics